Porvenir Miraflores was a Peruvian football club, playing in the district of Miraflores, Lima, Peru.

History
The club was founded on the Miraflores District, Lima.

The club was the winner of the 1956  and 1966 Segunda Division Peruana.

The club has played at the highest level of Peruvian football on six occasions, from 1966 until 1971 when it was relegated.

Honours

National
Peruvian Segunda División:
Winners (2): 1956, 1966
Runner-up (5): 1952, 1955, 1958, 1963, 1964

División Intermedia:
Winners (1): 1940

Regional
Liga Regional de Lima y Callao:
Runner-up (1): 1948

Notable players

 Raul Geller (born 1936), Peruvian-Israeli footballer

See also
List of football clubs in Peru
Peruvian football league system

External links
 Peru 2nd Division Champions (Lima)
 Peruvian First Division 1957, 1967, 1968, 1969, 1970 and 1971

Football clubs in Peru